Roane County Schools is the operating school district within Roane County, West Virginia. It is governed by the Roane County Board of Education.

Schools

High schools 
Roane County High School

Middle schools
Geary Elementary/Middle School 
Spencer Middle School 
Walton Elementary/Middle School

Elementary schools
Reedy Elementary School 
Spencer Elementary School

External links
Roane County Schools

School districts in West Virginia
Education in Roane County, West Virginia